Nigel Downer is a Canadian actor and comedian. He is most noted as the co-creator and co-star with Kris Siddiqi of the web series Bit Playas, for which they won the Canadian Screen Award for Best Writing in a Web Program or Series at the 9th Canadian Screen Awards in 2021. He was also a nominee for Best Lead Performance in a Web Program or Series.

Originally from Cambridge, Ontario, he is an alumnus of The Second City's Toronto troupe. He has also had guest roles in Killjoys, Titans, Frankie Drake Mysteries and Baroness von Sketch Show.

Filmography

Film

Television

References

External links

21st-century Canadian male actors
21st-century Canadian comedians
Canadian male television actors
Canadian male film actors
Canadian male stage actors
Canadian male web series actors
Canadian male comedians
Canadian sketch comedians
Black Canadian male actors
People from Cambridge, Ontario
Living people
Black Canadian comedians
Year of birth missing (living people)
Canadian Screen Award winners